Patrick Sheehan is an American Republican former politician and real estate agent. He served in the Oregon House of Representatives from 2011 until 2013, representing the 51st district, which includes Clackamas, Happy Valley, Sunnyside, Damascus, and parts of southeast Portland.

In 2010, Democrat Brent Barton declined to run for reelection in order to run for the Oregon Senate. Sheehan received 12,409 votes in the general election, compared to Democrat Cheryl Myers' 10,330. In 2012, Sheehan lost to Democrat Shemia Fagan, receiving 11,199 votes to Fagan's 12,584.

References

External links
 Campaign website
 Real estate website

Year of birth missing (living people)
Place of birth missing (living people)
Living people
Republican Party members of the Oregon House of Representatives
People from Clackamas, Oregon
American real estate brokers
21st-century American politicians